Baltimore Corner is a populated place on the Eastern Shore of Maryland, in Caroline County, Maryland, United States. It is near the Queen Anne's County line at the intersection of Maryland routes 312 and 313. It is not to be confused with Baltimore City, located on the opposite shore of the Chesapeake Bay.

The crossroads is so named because of its position on the route to Baltimore locals often used prior to the construction of the Chesapeake Bay Bridge.

References

Unincorporated communities in Caroline County, Maryland
Unincorporated communities in Maryland